Renton School District 403 is a public school district headquartered in Renton, Washington, USA

The district boundaries include the vast majority of Renton, all of Bryn Mawr-Skyway, and portions of the adjacent cities and communities of Bellevue, East Renton Highlands, Fairwood, Kent, Newcastle, SeaTac, and Tukwila.

On October 1st of the 2017-2018 school year, the district has an enrollment of 16,336 students.

Schools

High schools
Albert Talley Sr. High School
Hazen High School
Lindbergh High School
Renton High School

Middle schools
Dimmitt Middle School
McKnight Middle School
Nelsen Middle School
Risdon Middle School

Elementary schools
Benson Hill Elementary
Bryn Mawr Elementary
Campbell Hill Elementary
Cascade Elementary
Hazelwood Elementary
Highlands Elementary
Hilltop Heritage Elementary
Honeydew Elementary
Kennydale Elementary
Lakeridge Elementary
Maplewood Heights Elementary
Renton Park Elementary
Sartori Elementary
Sierra Heights Elementary
Talbot Hill Elementary
Tiffany Park Elementary

Other schools
Meadow Crest Early Learning Center
Griffin Home (6-12)
Renton Academy (K-12)
Sartori Education Center
Virtual High School
HOME Program

Renton Memorial Stadium
Renton Memorial Stadium is owned and operated by the district for use by its high schools and middle schools. Renton Memorial is used for High school Football, Track and Field, and soccer matches. It is also used at times for Middle School Track meets. It is located at 405 Logan Avenue N. in Renton, near Renton High School and includes an all-weather artificial turf field surrounded by an all-weather track.  The facility has covered seating for 5,500 and parking for 1,000 vehicles.
The stadium was constructed in 1948 and in 2011 a $7 million renovation project was undertaken.  The new design calls for a lighting system with adjustable lights that can illuminate the stands in the various colors of the schools that use the facility as their home field.

Staff 
Damien Pattenaude is the superintendent of the Renton School District, starting July 1, 2017.

References

External links
Renton School District
Renton School District Report Card 2010-11
Memorial Stadium renovation project information and photos

School districts in Washington (state)
Education in King County, Washington
Education in Renton, Washington
Renton, Washington
SeaTac, Washington